Yashar Teymur oglu Aliyev (born 19 August 1955) is an Azerbaijani diplomat who has been the Permanent Representative of Azerbaijan to the United Nations since 2014. Previously he was Permanent Representative to the United Nations from 2002 to 2006 and Ambassador to the United States from 2006 to 2011. He was also Azerbaijan's first ambassador to Cuba (2006).

Background and education
Yashar Aliyev is fluent in Azeri, English, Arabic, Russian and Turkish. He is married and has two children.

Aliyev attended Azerbaijan State University from 1972 to 1977, where he achieved the school's highest degree in Oriental Studies. He then attended the Academy of Sciences in Moscow, Russia, for post-graduate work at the Oriental Studies Institute, from 1980 to 1982. He also studied for one year in the early 1990s at the Diplomatic Academy of Russia's Ministry of Foreign Affairs.

Political and diplomatic career
After graduation from the University Aliyev worked for academic institutions in Azerbaijan, and served in the Soviet Union's military and trade missions in Iraq (1977–1979) and Kuwait (1985-1988.) Aliyev joined Azerbaijan's Ministry of Foreign Affairs in 1989 as Political Officer in the Department of Information and Political Analysis, later serving as First Secretary in 1990 and Deputy Head in 1991.  In 1992, he headed the Ministry's Department of International Organizations, before beginning his diplomatic career at the United Nations in New York City in the same year, serving as Counselor on Political Affairs at the Permanent Mission of Azerbaijan until June 2001.

During that time, he served two one-year terms as chargé d'affaires, in 1993 and in 2001. He was also his country's delegate to the First and Fourth Committees at the 47th - 56th sessions of the United Nations General Assembly.

He was appointed as his country's Permanent Representative to the UN in January 2002, and presented his credentials to the Secretary-General of the United Nations on 12 March 2002. Aliyev worked as Permanent Representative until November, 2006. He was also vice-president of the 59th session of the General Assembly, vice-president of the Economic and Social Council in 2004–2005, and vice-president of the United Nations Conference on the Illicit Trade in Small Arms and Light Weapons in All Its Aspects in 2001, and Chairman of the UN's Fourth Committee (Special Political and Decolonization) in 2005–2006. During his tenure as Permanent Representative Azerbaijan was elected to the UN Economic and Social Council (2002), UN Commission on Human Rights (2005), and UN Human Rights Council (2006.) In 2004, the item entitled "The situation in the occupied territories of Azerbaijan" was included in the agenda of the General Assembly.

Aliyev was also the first ambassador of Azerbaijan to Cuba (2006).

From November 2006 until October 26, 2011, he served as the Ambassador of the Republic of Azerbaijan to the United States. He was also accredited as an observer to the Organization of American States (2006-2011). Congressman Bill Shuster (R) in his statement at the Congress commended Yashar Aliyev's role in enhancing Azerbaijan-US relations. Other congressmen, Steve Cohen (D), Virginia Foxx (R) and Dan Boren (D) have also issued statements highlighting Ambassador Aliyev's diplomatic performance in Washington. "Through frequent and productive communications with the United States Congress, Ambassador Aliyev has helped raise awareness of the issues pertaining to Azerbaijan and foster mutual understanding between the peoples of the two countries", highlighted in the statement by Virginia Foxx.

After three years service in Azerbaijan (2011-2014), in May 2014 Yashar Aliyev was appointed again as Permanent Representative of Azerbaijan to the United Nations. On 10 June 2014, he presented his credentials to UN Secretary General.

References

External links
The Washington Diplomat Newspaper Ambassador profile
Biography on UN.org
Yashar Aliyev. The Nagorno-Karabakh Question:UN Reaffirms the Sovereignty and Territorial Integrity of Azerbaijan.Azerbaijan International, Winter 1998, N.6.4
Congressman Bill Shuster (R) remarks honouring the service of Yashar Aliyev

1955 births
Living people
Permanent Representatives of Azerbaijan to the United Nations
Ambassadors of Azerbaijan to the United States
Ambassadors of Azerbaijan to Cuba
Diplomatic Academy of the Ministry of Foreign Affairs of the Russian Federation alumni
Soviet diplomats
Azerbaijani diplomats